Karen Anne Bjorndal is an American biologist focusing in nutritional ecology, with an emphasis on vertebrate herbivores and the biology of sea turtles. She is a Distinguished Professor  of Biology at the University of Florida and Director of the Archie Carr Center for Sea Turtle Research (ACCSTR).

Education
After her junior year at  Occidental College, Bjorndal spent six months on the Galápagos Islands studying land iguanas. Upon her return, and completion of her degree, Bjorndal was convinced she wanted to write her PhD thesis on sea turtles. However, Dr Archie Carr refused to accept doctoral students who wished to focus on sea turtles as he felt it was too broad of a topic for a dissertation. After camping outside his house, penning letters, and digitizing his data, Bjorndal convinced Carr to Chair her Doctoral Committee. She worked alongside Carr after publishing her thesis Nutrition and grazing behavior of the green turtle, Chelonia mydas, a seagrass herbivore and took over his efforts at the Centre for Sea Turtle Research once he died.

Career
In 1987, Bjorndal was promoted to director of the Archie Carr Center for Sea Turtle Research at the University of Florida.

References

University of Florida faculty
American women biologists
University of Florida alumni
Occidental College alumni
Living people
Year of birth missing (living people)
American women academics
21st-century American women